The PostScript Latin 1 Encoding  (often spelled ISOLatin1Encoding) is one of the character sets (or encoding vectors) used by Adobe Systems' PostScript (PS) since 1984 (1982). In 1995, IBM assigned code page 1277 (CCSID 1277) to this character set. It is a superset of ISO 8859-1.

Code page layout

References

  (NB. This book is informally called "red book" due to its red cover.)
  (NB. This edition also contains a description of Display PostScript, which is no longer discussed in the third edition.)

Character sets